Herpetogramma mellealis is a moth in the family Crambidae. It was described by Charles Swinhoe in 1890. It is found in Myanmar.

References

Moths described in 1890
Herpetogramma
Moths of Asia